The Indian Archaeological Society (IAS) was registered in 1968 at Varanasi as a non-governmental, non-profit making professional organization of archaeologists, founded by A. K. Narain and other Archaeologists and Indologists.

As of 2007, the society has some 400 members and is registered in New Delhi as an educational and charitable Institution.

Its bulletin Purātattva has been appearing since its foundation, originally edited by  A.K. Narain, M. Seshadri and S.B. Rao, volume 30 appearing in 2005 edited by S.P. Gupta, K.N. Dikshit, and K.S. Ramachandran.

See also
Archaeological Survey of India
Indian History and Culture Society

External links
http://indarchaeology.org/archaeology/archaeology.htm

Archaeology of India